Bactriola paupercula is a species of beetle in the family Cerambycidae. It was described by Bates in 1885. It is known from Bolivia and Panama.

References

Forsteriini
Beetles described in 1885